Henry Brune Atkinson (17 March 1874 – 16 June 1960) was an Anglican priest in Australia during the Twentieth Century.

Hae was born in Tasmania and educated at Launceston Church Grammar School and the University of Tasmania. He was ordained deacon in 1847 and priest in 1848. He served curacies in Deloraine and Hobart. He held incumbencies at Evandale, Forth, Devonport and Hobart. He was Archdeacon of Launceston from 1928 until 1949.

References

1874 births
People from Tasmania
People educated at Launceston Church Grammar School
1960 deaths
Anglican archdeacons in Tasmania
20th-century Australian Anglican priests
University of Tasmania alumni